Country Club of Detroit, founded in 1897, is a private country club in Grosse Pointe Farms, Michigan. The architectural firm of Smith Hinchman & Grylls, known today as the SmithGroup, designed the Tudor Revival styled country club in 1927. H. S. Colt redesigned the country club's original golf course—designed by Bert Way—in 1912 and his partner Charles Alison later modified the design. In 1952, the club commissioned Robert Trent Jones, Sr. to complete a full redesign, and in 2011, the club fully renovated the course. in order to return to the original Colt and Alison design with a slightly updated interpretation.

Country Club of Detroit has twice hosted the U.S. Amateur, first in 1915 where Robert A. Gardner won and again in 1954 when Arnold Palmer won his first USGA title. In 2004 the Country Club of Detroit hosted Turning Point Invitational, which brought many past U.S. Amateur champions together to compete including Phil Mickelson and  Mark O'Meara.  The course hosted the 66th U.S. Senior Amateur in 2021.

See also
Detroit Golf Club

References

External links

Clubs and societies in Michigan
Golf clubs and courses in Michigan
Organizations based in Detroit
Sports venues in Wayne County, Michigan
Golf clubs and courses designed by Harry Colt
Golf clubs and courses designed by Robert Trent Jones
Golf clubs and courses designed by Tom Doak
1897 establishments in Michigan